David Adriaan Theodorus van Ooijen (25 December 1939, Wateringen - 8 November 2006, Huissen) was a Dutch Roman Catholic priest and politician.

1939 births
2006 deaths
20th-century Dutch Roman Catholic priests
Erasmus University Rotterdam alumni
Dutch Dominicans
Members of the House of Representatives (Netherlands)
Members of the Senate (Netherlands)
People from Wateringen